Parametric design is a design method where features (such as building elements and engineering components) are shaped according to algorithmic processes, in contrast to being designed directly. In this method, parameters and rules determine the relationship between design intent and design response. The term parametric refers to input parameters fed into the algorithms.

While today the term refers to the use of computer algorithms in design, there are precedents in the work of architects. Antoni Gaudí used a mechanical model for architectural design (see analogical model) by attaching weights onto a system of strings to determine shapes for building features, such as arches.

Parametric modeling can be divided into two main types:
 Propagation-based systems, in which algorithms result in final shapes that are unknown based on initial parametric inputs. 
 Constraint systems, in which final constraints are set and algorithms are used to define fundamentals (structures, material use, etc) that satisfy these constraints.

So called "form-finding" processes are implemented through propagation-based systems. Form-finding optimizes certain design goals against a set of design constraints, meaning the final form of the designed object is "found" based on these constraints.

History (early examples)

Analogue parametric design 

One of the earliest examples of parametric design was the upside down model of churches by Antonio Gaudi. In his design for the Church of Colònia Güell he created a model of strings weighted down with birdshot to create complex vaulted ceilings and arches. By adjusting the position of the weights or the length of the strings he could alter the shape of each arch and also see how this change influenced the arches connected to it. He placed a mirror on the bottom of the model to see how it would look once built right-side-up.

Features of Gaudí's method 

Gaudí's analogue method includes the main features of a computational of a parametric model (input parameters, equation, output):
 The string length, birdshot weight and anchor point location all form independent input parameters
 The vertex locations of the points on the strings being the outcomes of the model
 The outcomes are derived by explicit functions, in this case gravity or Newtons law of motion

By modifying individual parameters of these models Gaudí could generate different versions of his model while being certain the resulting structure would stand in pure compression.
Instead of having to manually calculate the results of parametric equations he could automatically derive the shape of the catenary curves through the force of gravity acting on the strings.

The German architect Frei Otto also experimented with non-digital parametric processes, using soap bubbles to find optimal shapes of tensegrity structures such as in the Munich Olympic Stadium, designed for the 1972 Summer Olympics in Munich.

Architecture 

Nature has often served as inspiration for architects and designers. Computer technology has given designers and architects the tools to analyse and simulate the complexity observed in nature and apply it to structural building shapes and urban organizational patterns. In the 1980s architects and designers started using computers running software developed for the aerospace and moving picture industries to "animate form".

One of the first architects and theorists that used computers to generate architecture was Greg Lynn. His blob and fold architecture is some of the early examples of computer generated architecture. Shenzhen Bao'an International Airport's new Terminal 3, finished in 2013, designed by Italian architect Massimiliano Fuksas, with parametric design support by the engineering firm Knippers Helbig, is an example for the use of parametric design and production technologies in a large scale building.

Urban design 
Parametric urbanism is concerned with the study and prediction of settlement patterns. Architect Frei Otto distinguishes occupying and connecting as the two fundamental processes that are involved with all urbanisation. Parametric processes can help optimize pedestrian or vehicle circulation, block and façade orientations and instantly compare the different performances of multiple urban design options.

Software

Power Surfacing 
Power Surfacing is a SolidWorks application for industrial design, freeform organic surface, and solids modeling. Scanned meshes can be reverse engineered with Power Surfacing RE.

Catia 
CATIA (Computer-aided three-dimensional interactive application) was used by architect Frank Gehry to design some of his award-winning curvilinear buildings such as the Guggenheim Museum Bilbao. Gehry Technologies have since created Digital Project, their own parametric design software based on their experience with CATIA.

Autodesk 3DS Max 
Autodesk 3ds Max is a parametric 3D modeling software which provides modeling, animation, simulation, and rendering functions for games, film, and motion graphics. 3ds Max uses the concept of modifiers and wired parameters to control its geometry and gives the user the ability to script its functionality. Max Creation Graph is a visual programming node-based tool creation environment in 3ds Max 2016 that is similar to Grasshopper and Dynamo.

Autodesk Maya 
Autodesk Maya is a 3D computer graphics software originally developed by Alias Systems Corporation (formerly Alias|Wavefront) and currently owned and developed by Autodesk, Inc. It is used to create interactive 3D applications, including video games, animated film, TV series, or visual effects. Maya exposes a node graph architecture. Scene elements are node-based, each node having its own attributes and customization. As a result, the visual representation of a scene is based on a network of interconnecting nodes, depending on each other's information. Maya is equipped with a cross-platform scripting language, called Maya Embedded Language. MEL is provided for scripting and a means to customize the core functionality of the software, since many of the tools and commands used are written in it. MEL or Python can be used to engineer modifications, plug-ins or be injected into runtime. User interaction is recorded in MEL, allowing novice users to implement subroutines.

Grasshopper 3D 

Grasshopper 3d (originally Explicit History) is a plug-in for Rhinoceros 3D that presents the users with a visual programming language interface to create and edit geometry.

Components or nodes are dragged onto a canvas in order to build a grasshopper definition. Grasshopper is based on graphs (see Graph (discrete mathematics)) that map the flow of relations from parameters through user-defined functions (nodes), resulting in the generation of geometry. Changing parameters or geometry causes the changes to propagate throughout all functions, and the geometry to be redrawn.

Autodesk Revit 
Autodesk Revit is building information modeling (BIM) software used by architects and other building professionals. Revit was developed in response to the need for software that could create three-dimensional parametric models that include both geometry and non-geometric design and construction information. Every change made to an element in Revit is automatically propagated through the model to keep all components, views and annotations consistent. This eases collaboration between teams and ensures that all information (floor areas, schedules, etc.) are updated dynamically when changes in the model are made.

Autodesk Dynamo 
Dynamo is an open source graphical programming environment for design. Dynamo extends building information modeling with the data and logic environment of a graphical algorithm editor.

GenerativeComponents 
GenerativeComponents, or known as GC, is a parametric CAD software developed by Bentley Systems that was first introduced in 2003 and became increasingly used in practice (especially by the London architectural community) by early 2005, and was commercially released in November 2007. GC epitomizes the quest to bring parametric modeling capabilities of 3D solid modeling into architectural design, seeking to provide greater fluidity and fluency than mechanical 3D solid modeling.

Users can interact with the software by either dynamically modeling and directly manipulating geometry, or by applying rules and capturing relationships among model elements, or by defining complex forms and systems through concisely expressed algorithms. The software supports many industry standard file input and outputs including DGN by Bentley Systems, DWG by Autodesk, STL (Stereo Lithography), Rhino, and others. The software can also integrate with Building Information Modeling systems.

The software has a published API and uses a simple scripting language, both allowing the integration with many different software tools, and the creation of custom programs by users. This software is primarily used by architects and engineers in the design of buildings, but has also been used to model natural and biological structures and mathematical systems.

Generative Components runs exclusively on Microsoft Windows operating systems.

VIKTOR 
VIKTOR is an application development platform that enables engineers and other domain experts to rapidly build their own online applications using Python. It is used to create parametric design models and integrates with many software packages. It enables users to make intuitive user interfaces (GUI), which include different form of visualizing results like 3D models, drawings, map or satellite views, and interactive graphs. This makes it possible to make the applications available to persons without programming affinity. 

Applications made with VIKTOR are online, meaning data is update automatically and everyone works with the same information and the latest models. It includes a user management system, allowing to give different rights to users.

Marionette 
Marionette is an open source graphical scripting tool (or visual programming environment) for the architecture, engineering, construction, landscape, and entertainment design industries that is built into the Mac and Windows versions of Vectorworks software. The tool was first made available in the Vectorworks 2016 line of software products. Marionette enables designers to create custom application algorithms that build interactive parametric objects and streamline complex workflows, as well as build automated 2D drawing, 3D modeling, and BIM workflows within Vectorworks software.

Built in the Python programming language, everything in Marionette consists of nodes which are linked together in a flowchart arrangement. Each node contains a Python script with predefined inputs and outputs that can be accessed and modified with a built-in editor. Nodes are placed directly into the Vectorworks document and then connected to create complex algorithms. Since Marionette is fully integrated into Vectorworks software, it can also be used to create entirely self-contained parametric objects that can be inserted into new and existing designs.

Modelur 
Modelur is a parametric urban design software plug-in for Trimble SketchUp, developed by Agilicity d.o.o. (LLC). Its primary goal is to help the users create conceptual urban massing. In contrast to common CAD applications, where the user designs buildings with usual dimensions such as width, depth and height, Modelur offers design of built environment through key urban parameters such as number of stories and gross floor area of a building.

Modelur calculates key urban control parameters on the fly (e.g. floor area ratio or required number of parking lots), delivering urban design information while the development is still evolving. This way it helps taking well-informed decision during the earliest stages, when design decisions have the highest impact.

See also 
 Design computing
 Generative design
 Parametricism
 Responsive computer-aided design
 Typography
 Visual programming language
 IJP The Book of Surfaces

References 

Computer-aided design
Design
Architecture